Gwyn Cready (born January 17, 1962) is an American author of romance novels.

Biography

Personal life
Cready was born in Pittsburgh, Pennsylvania. She attended Mt. Lebanon High School, where she became close friends with novelist Teri Coyne and shared theatre classes with actress Ming-Na, graduating in 1979. She attended the University of Chicago, graduating with a bachelor's in English literature in 1983 and an MBA in marketing in 1986. After graduation, Cready worked as a brand manager in the pharmaceutical industry.

She married Lester Pyle in 1986. They have two children, born in 1988 and 1994.

Writing career
Cready is a paranormal romance author who specializes in comedic time travel stories. Her novels are typically set in her hometown, Pittsburgh. Her first book, Tumbling Through Time (2008), involves a woman who tries on a pair of magical pink sandals in the Nine West shoe store in the Pittsburgh Airport and ends up on the deck of a privateer ship in 1705. Her second book, Seducing Mr. Darcy (2008), involves a woman who, through a magical massage in which one is encouraged to "imagine oneself in one's favorite book," enters the world of Pride and Prejudice.
 
Publishers Weekly called Tumbling Through Time "a joy" and Cready "an author worth watching." Given the humorous tone and situations which often involve one woman and two men, Cready's books have been likened to those of Janet Evanovich. Seducing Mr. Darcy won the 2009 RITA Award for Best Paranormal Romance Novel.

Works
 Tumbling Through Time (2007)
 Seducing Mr. Darcy (2008)
 Flirting With Forever (2010)
 Aching for Always (2010)
 A Novel Seduction (2011)
 Timeless Desire (2012)

References

Sources
Author's web site
Publishers Weekly review of Tumbling Through Time
Author's page on publisher site
Best Romance Stories review of Flirting With Forever 

1962 births
American romantic fiction writers
21st-century American novelists
Writers from Pittsburgh
University of Chicago alumni
University of Chicago Booth School of Business alumni
People from Mt. Lebanon, Pennsylvania
Living people
American women novelists
21st-century American women writers
Women romantic fiction writers
Novelists from Pennsylvania